Ouville-l'Abbaye is a commune in the Seine-Maritime department in the Normandy region in northern France.

Geography

Population

Places of interest
 The church of St.Martin, dating from the seventeenth century.
 The ruins of the seventeenth century abbey.
 Outline of a Roman villa.
 A château in Louis XV style, with many dependant buildings.
 The medieval manorhouse of Mont-de-Bourg.
 Several sixteenth century buildings.

See also
Communes of the Seine-Maritime department

References

Communes of Seine-Maritime